Filippo Distefano (born 28 August 2003) is an Italian professional footballer who plays for Fiorentina in Serie A.

Early life 
Filippo Distefano was born in Camaiore, a town in the Tuscan Province of Lucca, where he started to play football, at the club of Torre del Lago.

Club career 
Distefano first joined US Livorno – that was then playing in Serie A under Davide Nicola – where he spent 3 years, before joining the youth sector of ACF Fiorentina. First playing with the Primavera team, he was part of the squads who won the Coppa Italia Primavera in 2020 and 2021.

Having first been called to the first team by Vincenzo Italiano for the 20 November 2021 Serie A game against AC Milan, the young forward eventually made his professional debut for Fiorentina 10 days later, replacing José Callejón in the last minutes of a 3–1 Serie A home win against Sampdoria.

References

External links

Fiorentina primavera squad

2003 births
Living people
Italian footballers
Association football forwards
Sportspeople from the Province of Lucca
ACF Fiorentina players
Serie A players